Seven Invisible Men is a 2005 Lithuanian drama film directed by Šarūnas Bartas. It tells the story of a group of Russian outcasts and criminals who travel in a stolen car and behave dysfunctionally and irresponsibly, eventually clashing with the surrounding world. The film was a co-production between companies in Lithuania, France and Portugal.

It premiered in the Directors' Fortnight section of the 2005 Cannes Film Festival. It was nominated for the 2005 Nika Award for Best Feature Film.

Cast
 Dmitriy Podnozov as Vanechka
 Rita Klein as Masha
 Aleksandre Saulov as Pasha
 Saakanush Vanyan as Mila
 Denis Kirillov as Bobik
 Igor Cygankov as Karpusha

References

External links
 Seven Invisible Men at the production company's website 

2005 films
Films directed by Šarūnas Bartas
Lithuanian drama films
2000s road movies
2000s Russian-language films
Films produced by Paulo Branco